Geina didactyla is a moth of the Pterophoroidea family.  It is found in most of Europe, east into Russia.

The wingspan is 17–23 mm.

The larvae feed on Geum rivale, Ononis and Potentilla species.

External links
Swedish Moths
Fauna Europaea

Oxyptilini
Moths described in 1758
Taxa named by Carl Linnaeus
Moths of Europe